The voiceless epiglottal or pharyngeal trill, or voiceless epiglottal fricative, is a type of consonantal sound, used in some spoken languages.

The glyph is homoglyphic with the lowercase Cyrillic letter En (н).

Features
Features of the voiceless epiglottal trill/fricative:

Occurrence

See also
 Index of phonetics articles

Notes

References

External links
 

Trill consonants
Pulmonic consonants
Voiceless oral consonants